Karacahisar is a village (administratively a neighborhood) in the Milas district of Muğla Province, Turkey.

Its elevation is  AMSL. Population of Karacahisar is 672 as of 2012.

Gökçeler Canyon and İncirliin Cave inside the canyon are visitor attractions next to the village.

References

Villages in Muğla Province
Milas District